Illinois Route 123 (IL-123) is an east–west state highway in central Illinois, USA.   long, it stretches from Historic Route 66 at Williamsville to Illinois Route 125 near Pleasant Plains.

Route description 
All of IL-123's route is contained within Sangamon and Menard counties.  Major towns located on or adjacent to IL-123 include Athens, Petersburg, and Williamsville.

New Salem, the home of Abraham Lincoln in the 1830s, has been reconstructed as Lincoln's New Salem State Historic Site near Petersburg on IL-123.

History 
SBI Route 123 was what Illinois 123 is now, plus a road from Ashland south to Alexander at Interstate 72/U.S. Route 36. In 1999, Illinois 123 was truncated on its southern end to Illinois 125. In October 2003, Illinois 123 was extended east to Williamsville, replacing some of Illinois Route 124 in the process as well as all of Sangamon County Route 11.

Major intersections

References 

123
Transportation in Sangamon County, Illinois
Transportation in Menard County, Illinois